Dhangmari Wildlife Sanctuary is a wildlife sanctuary located at Bagerhat District of Bangladesh. It was officially declared as a wildlife sanctuary by the government of Bangladesh on 29 January 2012.

It is one of the safe zones for vultures as per the Vulture Safe Zone-2 Schedule of the government of Bangladesh in 2012. Dhangmari wetland is one of the dolphin sanctuaries in Bangladesh.

See also
 List of wildlife sanctuaries of Bangladesh

References 

Wildlife sanctuaries of Bangladesh